Johan Richter or Giovanni Richter (1665–1745) was a Swedish Baroque painter.

Biography
Richter was born in Stockholm, Sweden. His brothers included  medallist   Bengt Richter  (1670–1735). 
He mainly painted  landscapes or veduta of Venice. Around 1710 he traveled to Venice, where he was mentioned as active from 1717. His work  was influenced by Italian painter Luca Carlevarijs (1663–1730). He died during 1745 in Venice.

References

External links
Johan Richter (Nationalmuseum)

1665 births
1745 deaths
17th-century Italian painters
Italian male painters
18th-century Italian painters
Landscape artists
Painters from Venice
Italian vedutisti
17th-century Swedish painters
Swedish male painters
18th-century Swedish painters
18th-century Swedish male artists
18th-century Italian male artists